Dilaram Khanum (also spelled Del Aram or Delaram; died  1647) was a Safavid Georgian concubine of Safavid crown prince Mohammad Baqer Mirza, and the mother of King Safi ( 1629–1642).

Life
According to Prof.David Blow, in 1632 a court intrigue came to light that involved opposition to Safi's rule originating in the king's harem. This resulted in the king's ordering the massacre of forty women of the harem as well as the blinding and killing of almost all the sons of the daughters of Abbas I ( 1588–1629). Prior to the 1632 event, one of AbbasI's aunts, Zeynab Begum, was the leading female in the harem. After the event, Dilaram became the most influential matriarch. When Dilaram's son Safi died in 1647, he was succeeded by her grandson, who was known by his regnal name of AbbasII ( 1642–1666). In the early years of AbbasII's reign, when he was still young, grand vizier Saru Taqi functioned as his regent, with Dilaram's strong support.

Sponsorings
Dilaram Khanum sponsored the construction of two schools, in 1645/6 and 1647/8 respectively.  The "Jaddeh caravanserai"  (Jaddeh means grandmother) in Isfahan, constructed during the vizierate of Saru Taqi and being one of the largest in the city, referred to Dilaram Khanum, the grandmother of king Abbas II. In total, there are two caravanserais in Isfahan that are attributed to Dilaram Khanum's sponsoring.

References

Sources
 
 
 
 

1647 deaths
Iranian people of Georgian descent
Safavid concubines
17th-century Iranian women
17th-century people of Safavid Iran
17th-century slaves